Mary Kelly (born 1 May 1952) is a former Labour Party politician from County Limerick in Ireland. She served as a senator from 1993 to 1997.

A teacher and bookshop proprietor from Newcastle West, Kelly stood as a Labour candidate for Dáil Éireann in the Limerick West constituency at the 1992 general election and did not win a seat. In the subsequent elections to the 20th Seanad Éireann, she was elected on the Cultural and Educational Panel.

After a further defeat in the 1997 general election she did not stand in the 1997 elections to the 21st Seanad.

References

1952 births
Living people
Labour Party (Ireland) senators
Members of the 20th Seanad
20th-century women members of Seanad Éireann
Politicians from County Limerick